Premier Ice Hockey League will become one of two professional ice hockey leagues in the United Kingdom (the other being the Elite Ice Hockey League). It will replace the English Premier Ice Hockey League and the inaugural season took place in 2017–18.

A meeting was held on Sunday 26 February 2017 which confirmed the creation of the new league.

Teams

References

1
2
Second tier ice hockey leagues in Europe